The women's 78 kilograms (half heavyweight) competition at the 2010 Asian Games in Guangzhou was held on 13 November at the Huagong Gymnasium.

Schedule
All times are China Standard Time (UTC+08:00)

Results

Main bracket

Repechage

References

Results

External links
 
 Draw

W78
Judo at the Asian Games Women's Half Heavyweight
Asian W78